We're the Best of Friends is a 1979 duet album by American vocalists Natalie Cole and Peabo Bryson. It was released on November 2, 1979 by Capitol Records.

Reception

The album reached peak positions of number 44 on the Billboard 200 and number 7 on Billboard R&B Albums chart.

Track listing
"Gimme Some Time"  (Natalie Cole) - 3:19
"This Love Affair"  (Marvin Yancy, Natalie Cole) - 4:37
"I Want To Be Where You Are"  (Peabo Bryson) - 4:15
"Your Lonely Heart"  (Natalie Cole) - 4:30
"What You Won't Do for Love"  (Alfons Kettner, Bobby Caldwell) - 6:02
"We're the Best of Friends"  (Edward Howard, Thomas Campbell) - 4:14
"Let's Fall in Love / You Send Me" (Medley)  (Harold Arlen, Ted Koehler/Sam Cooke) - 4:08
"Love Will Find You" (Peabo Bryson) - 6:09

Personnel 

 Natalie Cole – lead and backing vocals
 Peabo Bryson – lead vocals, backing vocals (3, 5, 8), keyboards (3, 5, 6, 8), percussion (3, 5, 6, 8), horn arrangements (3, 5, 6, 8), rhythm arrangements (3, 5, 6, 8)
 Michael Wycoff – keyboards (1, 2, 4, 7)
 Marvin Yancy – keyboards (1, 4, 7)
 Thomas Campbell – keyboards (3, 5, 6, 8)
 Jim Boling – ARP synthesizer (3, 8), Minimoog (3, 8), Prophet-5 (3, 8), horn arrangements (3, 5), trumpet (3, 5, 6, 8), flugelhorn solo (5)
 Robert Palmer – guitar (1, 2)
 Phil Upchurch – guitar (1, 2, 4, 7)
 Richard Horton – guitar (3, 5, 6, 8)
 Keni Burke – bass (1, 2, 4, 7)
 Bobby Eaton – bass (1, 2, 4, 7)
 Dwight W. Watkins – bass (3, 5, 6, 8), backing vocals (3, 5, 8)
 James Gadson – drums (1, 2, 4, 7)
 Andre Robinson – drums (3, 5, 6, 8)
 Eddie "Bongo" Brown – percussion (1)
 Chuck Bryson – percussion (3, 5, 6, 8), backing vocals (3, 5, 8)
 Terry Dukes – percussion (3, 5, 6, 8), backing vocals (3, 5, 8)
 Bill Green – saxophone (2, 4) 
 Fred Jackson, Jr. – saxophone (2, 4, 7)
 Fred Smith – saxophone (2, 4, 7)
 Ernie Watts – saxophone (2, 4, 7)
 Ron Dover – saxophone (3, 5, 6, 8), horn arrangements (3, 5), tenor saxophone solo (8)
 George Bohanon – trombone (2, 4, 7)
 Bill Reichenbach Jr. – trombone (2, 4, 7)
 Chris Riddle – trombone (2, 4, 7)
 Daniel Dillard – trombone (3, 5, 6, 8), horn arrangements (3, 5)
 Oscar Brashear – trumpet (2, 4, 7)
 Bobby Bryant – trumpet (2, 4, 7)
 Thaddeus Johnson – trumpet (3, 5, 6, 8), horn arrangements (3, 5)
 Gayle Levant – harp (6, 8)
 David Blumberg – horn and string arrangements (2), conductor (2)
 Mark Davis – arrangements (2, 4, 7)
 Benjamin Barrett – orchestra contractor (2, 4, 7)
 Harry Bluestone – concertmaster (2, 4, 7)
 Johnny Pate – string arrangements and conductor (3, 5, 6, 8)
 Assa Drori – concertmaster (3, 5, 6, 8)
 Linda Williams – horn and string arrangements (4)
 Nelson Riddle – horn and string arrangements (7), conductor (7)

Production 
 Producers – Mark Davis and Marvin Yancy (Tracks 1, 2, 4 & 7); Peabo Bryson and Johnny Pate (Tracks 3, 5, 6 & 8).
 Executive Producer – Cecil Hale
 Recorded and Mixed by Rik Pekkonen
 Horns, rhythm and strings recorded by Butch Lynch and Steve Reyes.
 Vocals recorded by Gordon Shyrock
 Recorded at Hollywood Sound Recorders, Sound Factory and United Western Recorders (Hollywood, CA).
 Mastered by Bernie Grundman at A&M Studios (Hollywood, CA).
 Art Direction – Melissa Tormé-March
 Design – John Ernsdorf
 Photography – V. Hughes Frye

Charts

Singles

References

External links
 Peabo Bryson & Natalie Cole-We're The Best Of Friends at Discogs

1979 albums
Natalie Cole albums
Peabo Bryson albums
Albums arranged by Nelson Riddle
Albums produced by Johnny Pate
Capitol Records albums
Vocal duet albums